Hasanabad (also Romanized as Ḩasanābād; also known as Ḩoseynābād, and Husainābād) is a village in Barzrud Rural District, in the Central District of Natanz County, Isfahan Province, Iran. At the 2006 census, its population was 14, in 7 families.

References 

Populated places in Natanz County